FirstPEX is a private electronic market for private equity transactions that allows qualified investors to buy and sell equities to each other through a bidding process which enables the parties to find a mutually agreeable price. Its primary audience is entrepreneurs, investors and business owners, in which negotiations and the exchange of information on investment transactions is covered prior to closing transactions.

The platform was founded by Patrick Gruhn. The site also allows users to trade in non-liquid assets. Through a partnership with UK-based Autumn Capital Partners the platform was expanded outside of Switzerland to the rest of Europe. The platform is not subject to the regulatory supervision by the Swiss Financial Market Supervisory Authority (FINMA); however it is subject to authorization in Europe.

The site is based on the Django web framework, and has functionality to navigate through listings according to various of criteria such as asset class, investment volume, country of origin, sector and industry. It includes a live chat and a data room for the secure sharing of files.

References

External links
 Official website
 
 
 
 

Online auction websites of Switzerland
Private equity firms